Brian Howard (born September 9, 1981 in Seattle, Washington) is an American rugby union player. He plays prop for his club, Old Puget Sound Beach RFC. Howard was selected to tour with the USA national rugby union team, the USA Eagles XV, for the Autumn 2010 tour of Europe. He was first selected to the Eagles XV squad in 2010 during the Churchill Cup. Howard also spent two years (2004–2005) playing in the NFL for the St. Louis Rams.

References
 Player Profile eaglesxv.com()
 Player Profile usarugby.org()

1981 births
Living people
American rugby union players
St. Louis Rams players
Rugby union props